"Mississippi Goddam" is a song written and performed by American singer and pianist Nina Simone, who later announced the anthem to be her "first civil rights song". The song was released on her album Nina Simone in Concert in 1964, which was based on recordings of three concerts she gave at Carnegie Hall earlier that year. The album was her first release for the Dutch label Philips Records and is indicative of the more political turn her recorded music took during this period.

Simone composed "Mississippi Goddam" in less than an hour. Together with the songs "Ain't Got No, I Got Life",  "Four Women" and "To Be Young, Gifted and Black", it is one of her most famous protest songs and self-written compositions. In 2019, "Mississippi Goddam" was selected by the Library of Congress for preservation in the National Recording Registry for being "culturally, historically, or aesthetically significant".

Interpretation
The song captures Simone's response to the racially motivated murders of Emmett Till and Medgar Evers in Mississippi, and the 16th Street Baptist Church bombing in Birmingham, Alabama, killing four black children. On the recording she sarcastically announces the song as "a show tune, but the show hasn't been written for it yet." The song begins jauntily, with a show tune feel, but demonstrates its political focus early on with its refrain "Alabama's got me so upset, Tennessee's made me lose my rest, and everybody knows about Mississippi goddam." In the song, she says: "They keep on sayin' 'go slow' ... to do things gradually would bring more tragedy. Why don't you see it? Why don't you feel it? I don't know, I don't know. You don't have to live next to me, just give me my equality!"

Reception 
Simone first performed the song at the Village Gate nightclub in Greenwich Village, and shortly thereafter in March 1964 at Carnegie Hall, in front of a mostly white audience. The Carnegie Hall recording was subsequently released as a single and became an anthem during the Civil Rights Movement. "Mississippi Goddam" was banned in several Southern states. Boxes of promotional singles sent to radio stations around the country were returned with each record broken in half.

Simone performed the song in front of 10,000 people at the end of the Selma to Montgomery marches when she and other black activists, including Sammy Davis Jr., James Baldwin and Harry Belafonte crossed police lines.

Simone performed “Mississippi Goddam” on The Steve Allen Show on September 10, 1964. First Amendment scholar Ronald Collins pointed out that Allen, the “famed host of a nationally syndicated TV variety program… was one of the few who then dared to provide a forum for those with dissident views.” Therefore, when Nina Simone “joined Allen at the desk before [the] song, he told her he wanted her to sing ‘Mississippi Goddam’ because he knew it would provoke a lively discussion about censorship.”

Legacy

In 2022, in response to the decision on Dobbs v. Jackson Women's Health Organization overturning Roe v. Wade, scholar Shana Redmond told NPR "I think there's only a sense of continuity that we can take from its legacy, from its usage in this very moment. The structures to which Nina Simone was responding have continued to face us in the future that she hoped would be free and clear and beautiful. So the rage that she brought to the production of that song, the moment at which she said, 'I'm either going to take up arms, I'm going to buy a gun, or I'm going to write this song,' is precisely where so many people see themselves fitting in today."

In 2021, it was listed at No. 172 on Rolling Stone's "Top 500 Greatest Songs of All Time".

See also
 Civil rights movement in popular culture

References

External links
 Nina Simone in Concert performs "Mississippi Goddam", 1964, YouTube video.
 Mississippi Goddam Lyrics, MetroLyrics at Archive.org

Songs written by Nina Simone
Nina Simone songs
Protest songs
Songs against racism and xenophobia
1964 songs
Movements for civil rights
Songs based on actual events
Philips Records singles
Civil rights movement
Obscenity controversies in music
United States National Recording Registry recordings
Songs about Mississippi
Songs about Alabama